Raymond Lockwood (12 December 1928 – 31 December 2009) was a British figure skater who competed in ice dance. He competed in the pairs event at the 1952 Winter Olympics.

With partner Barbara Radford, he won the bronze medal at the 1955 World Figure Skating Championships.

Competitive highlights 
With Barbara Radford

References 

British male ice dancers
1928 births
2009 deaths
British male pair skaters
Olympic figure skaters of Great Britain
Figure skaters at the 1952 Winter Olympics
Sportspeople from London